These are the results of the rhythmic individual all-around competition in the 1984 Summer Olympics.
	
Women’s rhythmic individual all-around (and rhythmic gymnastics in general) was contested for the first time at these Games.

Qualification
The 20 highest scoring competitors out of 33 entrants advanced to the final.

Final

References

External links
 Official Olympic Report
 www.gymnasticsresults.com
 www.gymn-forum.net

Women's rhythmic individual all-around
1984
1984 in women's gymnastics
Women's events at the 1984 Summer Olympics